Nikita Madjaroglou was a male German international table tennis player.

He won a bronze medal at the 1931 World Table Tennis Championships in the men's singles and two years later he won another bronze in the mixed doubles with Annemarie Schulz at the 1933 World Table Tennis Championships.

See also
 List of table tennis players
 List of World Table Tennis Championships medalists

References

German male table tennis players
World Table Tennis Championships medalists